Princess Friederike Sophie Wilhelmine of Prussia (3 July 170914 October 1758) was a princess of Prussia (the older sister of Frederick the Great) and composer. She was the eldest daughter of Frederick William I of Prussia and Sophia Dorothea of Hanover, and granddaughter of George I of Great Britain. In 1731, she married Frederick, Margrave of Brandenburg-Bayreuth. The baroque buildings and parks built during her reign shape much of the present appearance of the town of Bayreuth, Germany.

Early life 

Born in Berlin, Wilhelmine shared the unhappy childhood of her brother, Frederick the Great, whose friend and confidante she remained all her life, with the exception of one short interval. She was fiercely beaten and abused by her governess during her childhood.  Wilhelmine later wrote: "Not a day passed that she [the governess] did not prove upon me the fearful power of her fists."  The mistreatment continued until the prince's governess finally said to their mother, who had been oblivious to the abuse, that she would not be surprised if Wilhelmine was eventually beaten until she was crippled.  After this, the governess was promptly replaced.

Being the eldest daughter in her family, she was early the target of discussions about political marriages. Her mother, Queen Sophia Dorothea, wished her to marry her nephew Frederick, Prince of Wales, but on the British side there was no inclination to make an offer of marriage except in exchange for substantial concessions that Wilhelmine's father would not accept. The fruitless intrigues carried on by Sophia Dorothea to bring about this match played a large part in Wilhelmine's early life. Her father, on the other hand, preferred a match with the House of Habsburg.

Marriage
After much talk of other matches came to nothing, Wilhelmine was eventually married in 1731 to her Hohenzollern kinsman, Frederick, Margrave of Brandenburg-Bayreuth. Frederick had been engaged to Wilhelmine's younger sister, Sophie, but at the last moment King Frederick William I decided to replace her with Wilhelmine. The groom was not consulted in this decision.

This marriage was only accepted by Wilhelmine under threats from her father and with a view to lightening her brother's disgrace. It was initially a happy marriage, but was eventually clouded first by limited financial resources and then by a love affair of the future Margrave with Dorothea von Marwitz, whose rise as an official mistress at the court of Bayreuth was bitterly resented by her brother Frederick the Great and caused an estrangement of some three years between him and Wilhelmine.

Margravine

When Wilhelmine's spouse came into his inheritance in 1735, the pair set about making Bayreuth a miniature Versailles. Their building projects included the rebuilding of their summer residence (now part of the Hermitage Museum); the rebuilding of the great Bayreuth opera house; the building of a second, new opera house; the building of a theater; and the reconstruction of the Bayreuth palace. The so-called Bayreuth Rococo style of architecture is renowned even today. The pair also founded the University of Erlangen. All of these ambitious undertakings pushed the court to the verge of bankruptcy.

The margravine made Bayreuth one of the chief intellectual centers of the Holy Roman Empire, surrounding herself with a court of wits and artists that accrued added prestige from the occasional visits of Voltaire and Frederick the Great.

Wilhelmine's brother Frederick granted her an allowance in exchange for troops, following the same procedure with her sisters. With the outbreak of the Seven Years' War, Wilhelmine's interests shifted from dilettantism to diplomacy. Austrian diplomats were trying to influence the court of Bayreuth to take their side against Prussia. In September 1745, during the Silesian war, Wilhelmine met with Maria Theresa of Austria. This almost destroyed her intimate relationship with her brother. In 1750 Wilhelmine visited the Prussian court for several weeks and met famous contemporaries such as Voltaire, Maupertuis and La Mettrie. In June 1754, the siblings met for the last time, after which Frederick swore her his eternal loyalty. She acted as eyes and ears for her brother in southern Germany until her death at Bayreuth on 14 October 1758, the day of Frederick's defeat by the Austrian forces of Leopold Josef Graf Daun at the Battle of Hochkirch.  Although Frederick had lost many friends and family to death throughout his life, Wilhelmine's hit him the hardest.  He suffered from severe illness for a week following news of Wilhelmine's death and fell into a depression from which he never fully recovered.

On the tenth anniversary of her death, her devastated brother had the Temple of Friendship built at Sanssouci in her memory.

Works 

The margravine's memoirs, Memoires de ma vie, written or revised in French between 1748 and her death, are preserved in the Royal Library of Berlin. They were first printed in two forms in 1810: a German translation down to the year 1733 from the firm of Cotta of Tübingen; and a version in French published by Vieweg of Brunswick, and coming down to 1742. There were several subsequent editions, including a German one published at Leipzig in 1908. An English translation was published in Berlin in 1904. For the discussion on the authenticity of these entertaining, though not very trustworthy, memoirs, see G. H. Pertz, Uber die Merkwürdigkeiten der Markgrafin (1851). See also Arvede Barine, Princesses et grandes dames (Paris, 1890); E. E. Cuttell, Wilhelmine, Margravine of Baireuth (London, 2 vols., 1905); ' and R. Fester, Die Bayreuther Schwester Friedrichs des Grossen (Berlin, 1902). Writer William Thackeray recommended the memoirs to "those who are curious about European Court history of the last age".

In addition to her other accomplishments, Wilhelmine was also a gifted composer and supporter of music. She was a lutenist, a student of Sylvius Leopold Weiss, and the employer of Bernhard Joachim Hagen.

Keyboard Concerto in G minor

 Allego, G minor.
 Cantabile, B flat major.
 Gavottes I & II, G minor. Cembalo, Fl, Strings

The obbligato flute part could have been played either by her brother or her husband, as both were flautists (and pupils of Quantz). Each movement takes wing from solid and vigorous openings. There is a stubborn insistence about the first tutti's repeated octave jumps, offset by the buoyancy of its striding sequences. She has a Bach-like flair for phrase extensions, which is also evident in the final gavotte where the solo shadows the orchestra and emerges to take the lead. Some of the ideas in the 34 bar slow movement are more son-of-Bach in style; and in the D minor second gavotte, which serves as a central "trio" to the first, there is a delicate episode of rather French, languishing descents.

Argenore: opera c. 1740. Seven soloists (3 sop., 1 mezzo-sop., 2 alto, 1 baritone or mezzo-sop.), and orchestra (1 flute, 2 oboes, 2 trumpets, strings, continuo). Performed in 1740 for her husband's birthday.

Cavatinen: short songs; voice, strings, harpsichord.

Flute Sonata: flute & keyboard, c. 1730.

Some chamber music still survives.

Issue

Wilhelmine's only child was Elisabeth Fredericka Sophie of Brandenburg-Bayreuth, born on August 30, 1732. Described by Casanova as the most beautiful princess in Germany, she was married to Karl Eugen, Duke of Württemberg, in 1748. She died on 6 April 1780 without surviving children.

Memoirs
An earlier English translation from the French of her memoirs was published in a two volume edition in 1828 by Hunt and Clarke, York St., Covent Garden.

Scribner and Welford published Princess Helena of the United Kingdom's German-to-English translation of Wilhelmine's memoirs in 1887.

In fiction 
Princess Wilhelmine is the main character of the 1909  historical novel A Gentle Knight of Old Brandenburg by Charles Major.

Ancestry

Notes

References 
 G.P. Gooch, Frederick the Great. The Ruler, the Writer, the Man (Alfred A. Knopf, 1947).  pp 217–247.
 Thea Leitner: Skandal bei Hof. Frauenschicksale an europäischen Königshöfen, Piper, München 2003, 
 Uwe A. Oster: Wilhelmine von Bayreuth. Das Leben der Schwester Friedrichs des Großen, Piper,  München, 2005, 

 Attribution
 
 Some of the information in this article is based on a translation of its German equivalent.

External links 

 
 Argenore (opera) from the Hamburg Opera House
 
 

1709 births
1758 deaths
Margravines of Brandenburg-Bayreuth
Musicians from Berlin
People from the Margraviate of Brandenburg
People from Bayreuth
House of Hohenzollern
German Baroque composers
Women classical composers
German memoirists
18th-century German people
Prussian princesses
German lutenists
Women memoirists
18th-century classical composers
18th-century German women
18th-century German women writers
18th-century German composers
18th-century German writers
Daughters of kings